Breviceps pentheri, the thicket rain frog, is a species of frogs found in South Africa and Eswatini, Mozambique, Botswana, and Namibia.

Distribution 
Breviceps pentheri occurs in the northern part of the southern African range. It prefers to dwell near shrubland.

Classification 
Breviceps pentheri has in the past been confused with Breviceps adspersus and listed as a synonym or subspecies of Breviceps adspersus but a study found that the frog was more closely related to the whistling rain frog and Bilbo's rain frog than Breviceps adspersus and it is now considered a different species entirely.

References 

Amphibians described in 1899
Amphibians of South Africa
Amphibians of Mozambique
Amphibians of Namibia
Amphibians of Botswana
Taxa named by Franz Werner
pentheri